The 1908 Atlantic hurricane season remains the only season on record to feature two hurricanes prior to the month of June. The season produced thirteen tropical cyclones, of which ten became tropical storms; six became hurricanes, and one of those strengthened into a major hurricane – tropical cyclones that reach at least Category 3 on the modern day Saffir–Simpson scale. The season's first system developed on March 6, which was the only known tropical cyclone to have developed in the month of March since official records began in 1851. The last storm transitioned into an extratropical cyclone on October 23.

Significant damage and at least 26 deaths occurred in Turks and Caicos Islands and the Bahamas as a result of this storm. Most of the other systems also impacted land. In May, the second storm caused thousands of dollars in damage and one indirect death in the Northeastern United States. The next system caused flooding in North Carolina, resulting in the deaths of two children. In late September and early October, the eighth system caused considerable damage in portions of the Greater Antilles and the Bahamas, leaving six people dead. A hurricane which struck the Caribbean coast of Nicaragua inflicted severe damage in several communities and killed at least two people. Overall, the tropical cyclones of the season collectively caused at least 37 fatalities.


Season summary 

Tropical cyclogenesis began on March 6, 1908, when the first system was initially detected northeast of the Lesser Antilles. It was the only cyclone to develop in the Atlantic in the month of March since the beginning of official records in 1851. On May 24, the next system developed near the Turks and Caicos Islands. Intensifying into a hurricane on May 28, the storm became one of only three May hurricanes in the 20th century, with the others being Able in 1951 and Alma in 1970. Additionally, due to this storm and the previous, the 1908 season became the only in which two systems reached hurricane status prior to the month of June. Thereafter, activity ceased for nearly two months, until the third cyclone formed northeast of the Bahamas on July 24, followed by another system forming in the northwestern Gulf of Mexico on July 29. The month of August featured two cyclones, a tropical depression and a tropical storm. September was the most active month, with five systems developing, including two hurricanes, one tropical storm, and two tropical depressions. In October, a hurricane and a tropical storm developed, the latter of which became extratropical on October 23, ending seasonal activity.

The season had a total of 10 tropical storms, 6 of which intensified into a hurricane. Re-analysis by José F. Partagás and Henry F. Diaz in 1997 resulted in the addition of the second system, while Christopher Landsea et al. added the sixth system in 2004 as part of the Atlantic hurricane reanalysis project. Seven out of the ten systems reaching at least tropical storm intensity made landfall during the season. Collectively, the tropical cyclones of the 1908 Atlantic hurricane season caused at least 37 fatalities.

The season's activity was reflected with an accumulated cyclone energy (ACE) rating of 95. ACE is a metric used to express the energy used by a tropical cyclone during its lifetime. Therefore, a storm with a longer duration will have high values of ACE. Thus, tropical depressions are not included here.

Systems

Hurricane One 

Tracking in an unusual south-southwest direction, the storm intensified into a Category 1 hurricane on the modern day Saffir–Simpson hurricane wind scale. Once in the Caribbean on March 8, the system slowly began to weaken, losing hurricane status the following morning. It is the only Atlantic tropical cyclone on record to have formed in March, according to NOAA's best track database dating from 1842.

On Saint Barthélemy, some buildings were damaged. Winds in Saint Martin toppled peasant tents and damaged crops. The storm beached 24 small crafts and boats and severely damaged crops.

Hurricane Two 

Moving northwestward, the depression struck the Turks and Caicos Islands. Around 06:00 UTC on May 26, the depression intensified into a tropical storm. By late on May 27, the storm curved northeastward. The cyclone strengthened into a hurricane by 06:00 UTC the following day, becoming one of only three May hurricanes in the 20th century, with the others being Able in 1951 and Alma in 1970. The cyclone made landfall west of Cape Hatteras, North Carolina, with winds of  around 21:00 UTC on May 29. A few hours later, the cyclone re-emerged into the Atlantic Ocean. Early on May 30, the hurricane weakened to a tropical storm. Accelerating northeastward, the storm struck eastern Long Island, New York, with winds of  late on May 30, just prior to making landfall near Noank, Connecticut, at the same intensity around 23:00 UTC. The storm became extratropical over southern Maine early on May 31. The remnants continued northeastward until dissipating over the northern portion of the state several hours later.

Winds disrupted communications with towns along the Outer Banks. Rough seas generated by the storm in New Jersey swept away a significant amount of sand, especially at Long Branch. In Rhode Island, storm surge and abnormally high tides wrecked many boats at Narragansett Bay. One person died of exhaustion during the storm and another suffered a serious injury when a tree fell on a car. Damage in the state was estimated in the thousands of dollars.

Hurricane Three 

Heading northwestward, the depression intensified into a tropical storm about 24 hours later. Thereafter, the cyclone executed a slow cyclonic loop just north of Grand Bahama island, until it turned northward on July 29. Around 11:00 UTC on July 31, the hurricane made landfall in modern-day Emerald Isle, North Carolina, at the same intensity. The system then curved east-northeastward and weakened to a tropical storm just prior to re-emerging into the Atlantic late on July 31. The extratropical remnants continued northeastward across Newfoundland before dissipating on August 3.

Hurricane warnings were issued on July 30 from Hatteras, North Carolina, to Norfolk, Virginia. The storm washed away cottages and boardwalks in Wrightsville. Flooding submerged the main city streets in Kingston and washed out railroad bridges and tracks. Two children drowned in the town of Roper. The extratropical remnants of the storm caused eight deaths in Atlantic Canada after several boats capsized. In Nova Scotia, the storm downed a number of trees and damaged many properties in Halifax. Heavy rainfall also washed out unpaved roads in the city and left them nearly impassable.

Tropical Storm Four 

A tropical depression developed just offshore Sabine Pass, Texas, around 00:00 UTC on July 29. Moving southeastward, the depression intensified into a tropical storm about 12 hours later. Eventually, it recurved to the north-northwest and headed toward Louisiana. At 22:00 UTC on July 31, the cyclone made landfall on Marsh Island, Louisiana, at the same intensity. The storm weakened to a tropical depression early on August 2, around the time it curved northeastward. By late on August 3, the system dissipated over northern Mississippi.

The storm dropped heavy rainfall in portions of Louisiana. The city of Franklin recorded  of precipitation between July 26 and August 2, including  in one day. The coastal parishes of Louisiana experienced severe flooding, with major damage to rice crops. Farther east, floodwaters inundated streets in the outskirts of New Orleans, necessitating the use of skiffs for navigation. Four coal barges carrying cargo collectively valued at $12,000 sank in the Mississippi River near New Orleans.

Tropical Storm Five 

The storm moved westward, until turning northeastward late on August 31. Eight hours later, it made landfall near Cape Lookout, North Carolina, at the same intensity. Shortly thereafter, the storm reemerged into the Atlantic Ocean. The storm brought strong winds to portions of North Carolina and Virginia.

Hurricane Six 

Moving west-northwestward, the storm passed just north of the Lesser Antilles and slowly intensified, becoming a hurricane just offshore the Dominican Republic early on September 11. The storm curved northward and passed over or near several islands on September 13 and September 14, including Exuma, Cat Island, and Eleuthera. Later on September 14, the cyclone turned northeastward and exited the island chain. While traversing the open Atlantic, the system slowly weakened and remained a hurricane until falling to tropical storm intensity late on September 18 while just offshore Newfoundland. The storm soon struck the island and became extratropical near Port Rexton. The extratropical remnants continued northeastward and dissipated over the Labrador Sea late the following day.

The passing storm brought high winds and rough surf to the northern coast of Puerto Rico between September 9–10. In the Turks and Caicos Islands, wind gusts near  uprooted many trees and partially destroyed many buildings and homes on Grand Turk Island. The Haitian sloop Telegraph capsized at Hawk's Nest with the loss of all occupants. Overall, the storm killed at least 19 people in the island chain. In the Bahamas, significant damage was reported on Acklins, Crooked Island, Inagua, Long Cay, Long Island, Rum Cay, and San Salvador Island. In Clarence Town, which is located on Long Island, the storm completely destroyed the churches, courthouse, and jail, as well as 97 percent of homes, leaving only five dwellings standing. On Inagua, the crew of the steamer Sibiria observed many wood-frame homes being destroyed in Matthew Town. The schooner Beulah McCabe sank in the vicinity of the Bahamas, causing the deaths of seven people. Wind gusts ranging from  impacted Bermuda, though damage was mainly limited to some uprooted trees. In Atlantic Canada, some boats along the south coast of Nova Scotia suffered minor damage.

Tropical Storm Seven 

However, the cyclone soon quickly weakened, falling to tropical depression intensity about 18 hours later.

Hurricane Eight 

The storm headed west-northwestward and slowly intensified, becoming a hurricane around the time it struck Guadeloupe on September 25. Entering the Caribbean Sea, the hurricane continued westward, until curving to the northwest while south of Hispaniola on September 27. The system soon emerged over the Gulf of Gonâve, where it briefly weakened to a tropical storm late on September 28. After the cyclone re-emerged into the Atlantic, it intensified while approaching the western Bahamas, becoming a Category 2 late on September 30. The hurricane peaked with maximum sustained winds of  around the time it made landfall on Andros Island early the next day. The storm turned north-northeastward and then northeastward, causing it to strike the Abaco Islands before reaching the open Atlantic again late on October 1. The storm then executed a small cyclonic loop, before resuming an east-northeastward movement. The extratropical remnants continued east-northeastward and dissipated several hours later.

On Guadeloupe, the storm uprooted many trees, severely damaged sugarcane crops, and deroofed sugar factories. Communications were also disrupted. The captain of the Dutch steamer Prins Willem V. reported considerable damage in Haiti. In Cuba, the hurricane destroyed several buildings, including the custom house, which was under construction. Many fruit groves suffered substantial damage. The storm produced hurricane-force winds and heavy precipitation over the western Bahamas. At Nassau, sustained winds reached . Property damage was generally light, however, with only smaller dwellings and outbuildings being demolished. Several large vessels capsized in the vicinity of the island, resulting in six deaths. On the Abaco Islands, several buildings at a timber company's plant, one home, and several huts were destroyed. Eleuthera also reported extensive damage, including the destruction of a mission house, a chapel, and several other buildings. The storm toppled many coconut trees, while one plantation alone lost about 300 banana trees. Throughout the Bahamas, this storm, combined with the hurricane in mid-September, resulted in the near total loss of grapefruit, orange, and sisal crops. Additionally, the cyclone downed a number of trees and destroyed many gardens. Heavy rains and high winds also pelted Bermuda, damaging a number of structures.

Hurricane Nine 

Moving westward, the depression became a tropical storm early the following day. The storm later curved to the west-northwest and intensified into a Category 1 hurricane around 12:00 UTC on October 16. About 24 hours later, it became a Category 2 hurricane. Early the next day, it made landfall in Nicaragua near Pearl Lagoon, South Caribbean Coast Autonomous Region. The hurricane rapidly weakened after moving inland, falling to tropical storm intensity by 12:00 UTC on October 18 and weakening to a tropical depression at 00:00 UTC on October 19. Several hours later, the storm dissipated over Honduras.

The hurricane caused extensive impacts along the coast of Nicaragua from Cabo Gracias a Dios to Pearl Cays, with telegraph and telephone communications interrupted and railroads substantially damaged in that area. The towns of Prinzapolka and Rio Grande were completely destroyed. The New York Times reported "much loss of life," including at least two deaths in Rio Grande.

Tropical Storm Ten 

Late on October 21, the storm curved southwestward and then northwestward early the next day. The extratropical low moved ashore South Carolina near McClellanville before dissipating several hours later.

Other systems 
In addition to the ten tropical cyclones reaching at least tropical storm intensity, three others remained tropical depressions. The depression moved northeastward and later southeastward, before dissipating on August 5. The depression moved southwestward and passed through the Cape Verde islands before dissipating on September 15. The depression moved east-northeastward and may have intensified into a tropical storm. However, the depression was last noted on the following day.

See also 

 Atlantic hurricane season
 List of tropical cyclones
 1900–1940 South Pacific cyclone seasons
 1900–1950 South-West Indian Ocean cyclone seasons
 1900s Australian region cyclone seasons

References

External links 

 Monthly Weather Review
 March hurricane

 
1908 meteorology
1908 natural disasters